Tom London (born Leonard T. Clapman; August 24, 1889 – December 5, 1963) was an American actor who played frequently in B-Westerns. According to The Guinness Book of Movie Records, London is credited with appearing in the most films in the history of Hollywood, according to the 2001 book Film Facts, which says that the performer who played in the most films was "Tom London, who made his first of over 2,000 appearances in The Great Train Robbery, 1903. He used his birth name in films until 1924.

Life and career
Born in Louisville, Kentucky, London got his start in movies as a props man in Chicago, Illinois. His debut was in 1915 in the Western Lone Larry, performing under his own name. The first film in which he was billed under his new name was Winds of Chance, a World War I film, in which he played "Sgt. Rock". London was a trick rider and roper, and used his trick skills in scores of Westerns. In the silent-film era, he often played villainous roles, while in later years, he often appeared as the sidekick to Western stars such as  Sunset Carson in several films.

One of the busiest character actors, he appeared in over 600 films. London made many guest appearances in television shows through the 1950s, such as The Range Rider, with Jock Mahoney and Dick Jones. He also played Sam, the attendant of Helen Ramirez's (Katy Jurado) in High Noon. His last movie was Underworld U.S.A. in 1961, and his final roles on TV were in Lawman and The Dakotas.

Personal life

London married actress Edith Stayart (1890 - August 7, 1970), born Edythe B. Stayart, who has several roles in films in the 1920s including Nan of the North. On July 5, 1952, he married Louvie Munal in Del Rio, Texas.

Death
London died at his home in North Hollywood at age 74.

Selected filmography

1900s
The Great Train Robbery (1903, Short)

1910s
 Liberty (1916)
 The Purple Mask (1916) - Robert Jackson, Inventor
 The Lion's Claws (1918) - Reglis
 The Heart of Humanity (1918) - Minor Role
 Leave It to Susan (1918) - Minor Role
 The Lone Star Ranger (1919) - Minor Role
 The Last of the Duanes (1919)
 The Great Air Robbery (1919) - Minor Role
 The Heart of Humanity (1918) 
 The Lion Man (1919) - Lacey
 The Heart of Texas (1919)

 
1920s

 His Nose in the Book (1920, Short)
 Her Five-Foot Highness (1920) - Slim Higgins
 Wolf Tracks (1920, Short)
 Masked (1920, Short)
 Under Northern Lights (1920) - Jacques Foucharde
 'In Wrong' Wright (1920, Short)
 King of the Circus (1920, Short)
 Colorado (1921) - David Collins
 Ghost City (1921) - Bob Clark
 Nan of the North (1922) - Dick Driscoll
 The Long Chance (1922) - John Corbaly
 The Cowboy and the Lady (1922) - Joe
 The Social Buccaneer (1923) - Louis Lenoir
 To the Last Man (1923) - Guy
 Our Hospitality (1923) - James Canfield (uncredited)
 The Call of the Canyon (1923) - Lee Stanton
 Mile-a-Minute Morgan (1924) - Kenneth Winster
 Heritage of the Desert (1924) - Dave Naab
 The Right of the Strongest (1924) - Fred Dearing
 The Perfect Alibi (1924) - Ollie Summers
 Not Built for Runnin''' (1924) - Lem Dodge
 The Loser's End (1924) - Barney Morris
 The Air Hawk (1924) - Kellar
 Not Guilty for Runnin' (1924) - Lem Dodge
 Headin' Through (1924) - Roy Harlan
 The Trouble Buster (1925) - Larry Simons
 The Shield of Silence (1925) - Harry Ramsey
 The Blood Bond (1925)
 Border Vengeance (1925) - Flash Denby
 Winds of Chance (1925) - RCMP Sgt. Rock
 Three in Exile (1925) - Jed Hawkings
 Win, Lose or Draw (1925) - Fred Holt
 Ranchers and Rascals (1925) - Larry Simmons
 Silent Sheldon (1925) - Bill Fadden
 Luck and Sand (1925) - Sanger
 The Demon Rider (1925) - Black Hawk
 The Cowboy Musketeer (1925) - Joe Dokes
 Clicking Hoofs (1926)
 The Bar-C Mystery (1926)
 Chasing Trouble (1926) - Jerome Garrett
 Dangerous Traffic (1926) - Marc Brandon
 Snowed In (1926, Serial) - U.S. Marshal Thayer
 Code of the Northwest (1926) - Pvt. Frank Stafford
 West of the Rainbow's End (1926) - Harry Palmer
 Desert Greed (1926) - Ranger (uncredited)
 The Grey Devil (1926)
 The Long Loop on the Pecos (1927) - Laird
 The Golden Stallion (1927) - Jules La Roux
 The Return of the Riddle Rider (1927) - Buck White
 The King of Kings (1927) - Roman Soldier (uncredited)
 The Little Boss (1927)
 Border Blackbirds (1927)
 The Devil's Twin (1927) - Otis Dilbre
 The Boss of Rustler's Roost (1928) - 'Pronto Giles', the Foreman
 The Apache Raider (1928) - Griffin Dawson
 The Bronc Stomper (1928) - Alan Riggs
 Put 'Em Up (1928) - Jake Lannister
 The Yellow Cameo (1928) - Spraker
 The Michigan Kid (1928) - Minor Role (uncredited)
 Yellow Contraband (1928) - Drag Conners
 The Price of Fear (1928) - 'Flash' Hardy
 The Mystery Rider (1928) - David Manning / The Claw
 In Old Arizona (1928) - Man in Saloon (uncredited)
 Untamed Justice (1929) - Henchman Jim
 The Lawless Legion (1929) - Henchman (uncredited)
 The Harvest of Hate (1929) - Martin Trask
 Chinatown Nights (1929) - Cop (uncredited)
 The Border Wildcat (1929) - Joe Kern
 The Black Watch (1929) - 42nd Highlander (uncredited)
 Queen of the Northwoods (1929) - Garvin / The Wolf-Devil
 No More Children (1929) - Detective
 Hell's Heroes (1929) - Croupier (uncredited)
 New York Nights (1929) - Cop (uncredited)

1930s

 The Woman Racket (1930) - Hennessy
 Firebrand Jordan (1930) - Ed Burns
 Bar-L Ranch (1930) - Henchman (uncredited)
 Troopers Three (1930) - Sgt. Hank Darby
 All Quiet on the Western Front (1930) - 1st Medic Orderly (uncredited)
 Safety in Numbers (1930) - Motorist (uncredited)
 Romance of the West (1930) - 'Kayo' Mooney
 The Storm (1930) - Head Mountie
 Borrowed Wives (1930) - Mac - Motorcycle Cop (uncredited)
 River's End (1930) - Mountie (uncredited)
 Under Texas Skies (1930) - Fake Captain Hartford
 The Third Alarm (1930) - Fireman Tom
 See America Thirst (1930) - Spumoni Hood (uncredited)
 Westward Bound (1930) - Dick - Rustler
 The Spell of the Circus (1931) - Butte Morgan
 Sheer Luck (1931) - Police Lieutenant
 Trails of the Golden West (1931)
 Dishonored (1931) - Minor Role (uncredited)
 Air Police (1931) - Spike - Joe's Henchman
 Gun Smoke (1931) - Hank Bailey (uncredited)
 Quick Millions (1931) - Atlas Newsreel Man (uncredited)
 The Secret Six (1931) - Blackjacking Gangster (uncredited)
 The Two Gun Man (1931) - Lem Tolliver
 East of Borneo (1931)
 Lightnin' Smith Returns (1931) - Lightning' Smith
 The Galloping Ghost (1931, Serial) - Mullins - Henchman
 Arizona Terror (1931) - Chuckawalla - Henchman
 Range Law (1931) - Henchman Cleve
 Lasca of the Rio Grande (1931) - (uncredited)
 Platinum Blonde (1931) - Reporter (uncredited)
 Men in Her Life (1931) - Court Bailiff (uncredited)
 West of Broadway (1931) - Cowhand (uncredited)
 The Sea Ghost (1931) - Barroom Sailor (uncredited)
 Valley of Badmen (1931) - Horton
 Dr. Jekyll and Mr. Hyde (1931) - Minor Role (uncredited)
 Without Honors (1932) - 'Sholt' Fletcher
 One Man Law (1932) - Syndicate Land Buyer (uncredited)
 Cock of the Air (1932) - Military Policeman (uncredited)
 The Beast of the City (1932) - First Policeman Killed in Final Raid (uncredited)
 Shopworn (1932) - 'Pa' Lane (uncredited)
 Outlaw Justice (1932) - Henchman Hank
 The Silver Lining (1932) - Central Park Mugger (uncredited)
 The Trial of Vivienne Ware (1932) - Cop at Door (uncredited)
 Ghost Valley (1932) - Henchman Red (uncredited)
 Honor of the Mounted (1932) - Henchman (uncredited)
 Beyond the Rockies (1932) - Henchman Kirk Tracy
 The Thirteenth Guest (1932) - Detective Carter (uncredited)
 The Lost Special (1932, Serial) - Jim Dirk / Detective Dane
 Laughter in Hell (1933) - Guard (uncredited)
 The Ironmaster (1933) - Turner
 Clancy of the Mounted (1933, Serial) - Corporal McGregor
 The Thundering Herd (1933) - Henchman (uncredited)
 King of the Jungle (1933) - Lion Attendant (uncredited)
 Gabriel Over the White House (1933) - Secret Service Man (uncredited)
 The Whispering Shadow (1933, Serial) - Dupont - Henchman #5 [Chs. 1–8,12] (uncredited)
 Justice Takes a Holiday (1933) - Convict (uncredited)
 The Big Cage (1933) - Ship Captain (uncredited)
 Made on Broadway (1933) - Plainclothesman (uncredited)
 The Phantom of the Air (1933, Serial) - Jim - Radio Man (uncredited)
 The Nuisance (1933) - Kelley's Associate (uncredited)
 Sunset Pass (1933) - Ben
 The Man from Monterey (1933) - Lt. Adams (uncredited)
 The Fugitive (1933) - Tom - Foreman
 Gordon of Ghost City (1933, Serial) - Pat Campbell (Ch's. 6 & 7) (uncredited)
 One Year Later (1933) - Taxicab Driver (uncredited)
 Man of the Forest (1933) - Ranch Hand (uncredited)
 Lady for a Day (1933) - Reception Guest (uncredited)
 Brief Moment (1933) - Thug (uncredited)
 Police Car 17 (1933) - Detective (uncredited)
 The Wolf Dog (1933, Serial) - Brooks
 I'm No Angel (1933) - Sideshow Spectator (uncredited)
 Broadway Thru a Keyhole (1933) - Member of Rocci's Mob (uncredited)
 The Perils of Pauline (1933, Serial) - Soldier at American Consulate (uncredited)
 Lone Cowboy (1933) - Conductor (uncredited)
 Smoky (1933) - Horse Trader (uncredited)
 Beggars in Ermine (1934) - Steel Worker (uncredited)
 The Crime Doctor (1934) - Detective at Airport Arrest (uncredited)
 The Countess of Monte Cristo (1934) - Police Detective (uncredited)
 I Believed in You (1934) - Policeman (uncredited)
 Mystery Ranch (1934) - Blake
 St. Louis Woman (1934) - Lions Coach Ryan
 The Vanishing Shadow (1934, Serial) - Policeman [Chs. 1, 4] (uncredited)
 Ferocious Pal (1934) - Dave Brownell
 Twisted Rails (1934) - Sheriff James
 Monte Carlo Nights (1934) - Blondie's Brother (uncredited)
 Hollywood Party (1934) - Paul Revere (uncredited)
 Rawhide Mail (1934) - Al - Barfly (uncredited)
 Such Women Are Dangerous (1934) - Bailiff (uncredited)
 Burn 'Em Up Barnes (1934, Serial) - Parsons - Oil Speculator [Chs. 10-12] (uncredited)
 Baby, Take a Bow (1934) - Man on Train (uncredited)
 Fighting Hero (1934) - Sheriff
 Bachelor Bait (1934) - Detective (uncredited)
 The Cat's-Paw (1934) - Murph - Cop (uncredited)
 The Captain Hates the Sea (1934) - Minor Role (uncredited)
 The Oil Raider (1934) - Oil Well Driller (uncredited)
 Outlaw's Highway (1934) - Chet
 The Prescott Kid (1934) - Henchman Slim (uncredited)
 Men of the Night (1934) - Dave Burns (uncredited)
 Jealousy (1934) - Minor Role (uncredited)
 Mystery Mountain (1934, Serial) - Morgan - Rattler Henchman
 Mills of the Gods (1934) - Workman (uncredited)
 When Lightning Strikes (1934) - Wolf
 The Cactus Kid (1935) - Sheriff
 Law Beyond the Range (1935) - Jerry Grant (uncredited)
 The Whole Town's Talking (1935) - Guard (uncredited)
 The Revenge Rider (1935) - Deputy Peters (uncredited)
 Million Dollar Haul (1935) - Henchman Joe
 The Miracle Rider (1935, Serial) - Sewell - Henchman
 The Tia Juana Kid (1935) - Gang Leader
 Goin' to Town (1935) - Cowboy (uncredited)
 $10 Raise (1935) - Warehouse Foreman (uncredited)
 Toll of the Desert (1935) - Sheriff Jackson
 The Test (1935) - Trapper (uncredited)
 Let 'Em Have It (1935) - Penitentiary Guard (uncredited)
 Justice of the Range (1935) - Barfly (uncredited)
 The Roaring West (1935, Serial) - Henchman Butch
 Rio Rattler (1935) - Ranger Bob Adams
 Trails End (1935) - Randall's Henchman
 Tumbling Tumbleweeds (1935) - Henchman Sykes (uncredited)
 Red Salute (1935) - Navy Officer (uncredited)
 Cappy Ricks Returns (1935) - Sailor (uncredited)
 Courage of the North (1935) - Mordant
 Timber Terrors (1935) - Burke
 This Is the Life (1935) - Highway Patrol Officer (uncredited)
 Barbary Coast (1935) - Ringsider with Bar Girl (uncredited)
 Way Down East (1935) - Town Choir Singer (uncredited)
 Grand Exit (1935) - Policeman (uncredited)
 Hong Kong Nights (1935) - Blake
 The Sagebrush Troubadour (1935) - Sheriff (uncredited)
 The Last of the Clintons (1935) - Luke Todd
 The Fighting Marines (1935, Serial) - Miller - Henchman M-90
 Gallant Defender (1935) - Smiley, Wounded Henchman (uncredited)
 Gun Play (1935) - Meeker
 Skull and Crown (1935) - Jennings - Henchman
 Just My Luck (1935) - Plant Manager
 Five Bad Men (1935)
 The Mysterious Avenger (1936) - Henchman (uncredited)
 The Lawless Nineties (1936) - Ward - Henchman
 Wildcat Saunders (1936) - Pete Hawkins
 Call of the Prairie (1936) - Dealer (uncredited)
 O'Malley of the Mounted (1936) - Lefty - Henchman
 Heroes of the Range (1936) - Bud
 The Clutching Hand (1936, Serial) - Nellie D Sailor [Chs. 1,11-14] (uncredited)
 Avenging Waters (1936) - Henchman Huffy (uncredited)
 Pinto Rustlers (1936) - Rustler (uncredited)
 The Border Patrolman (1936) - Johnson
 Guns and Guitars (1936) - Henchman Connor
 The Crime of Dr. Forbes (1936) - Iron Worker (uncredited)
 The Phantom Rider (1936, Serial) - Henchman Tom (Ch's 12–14) (uncredited)
 The Bride Walks Out (1936) - Ship's Officer (uncredited)
 Pepper (1936) - Guard (uncredited)
 Sworn Enemy (1936) - Gangster (uncredited)
 Bulldog Edition (1936) - Henchman (uncredited)
 Ramona (1936) - American Settler (uncredited)
 Sworn Enemy (1936) - Henchman Sneed
 Career Woman (1936) - Bailiff—Clarkdale (uncredited)
 Secret Valley (1937) - 2nd Taxi Driver (uncredited)
 Santa Fe Rides (1937) - Sheriff (uncredited)
 The Silver Trail (1937) - Looney
 I Promise to Pay (1937) - Arresting Detective (uncredited)
 Bar-Z Bad Men (1937) - Sig Bostell
 The Frame-Up (1937) - Fred (uncredited)
 Law of the Ranger (1937) - Henchman Pete
 Venus Makes Trouble (1937) - Stanton Crony (uncredited)
 This Is My Affair (1937) - Lil's Flustered Spectator (uncredited)
 Angel's Holiday (1937) - Truck Driver (uncredited)
 Roaring Timber (1937) - Henchman 'Duke'
 Three Legionnaires (1937) - Joe- Motorcycle Military Policeman (uncredited)
 Outlaws of the Orient (1937) - Red (uncredited)
 Western Gold (1937) - Clem
 Jungle Menace (1937, Serial) - Detective Interrogating Pete (uncredited)
 Sky Racket (1937) - Detective in Chase Car (uncredited)
 Radio Patrol (1937, Serial) - Eddie Lewis (uncredited)
 The Old Wyoming Trail (1937) - Townsman (uncredited)
 Springtime in the Rockies (1937) - Tracy
 Blossoms on Broadway (1937) - Cop (uncredited)
 Zorro Rides Again (1937, Serial) - O'Shea [Ch. 1]
 Courage of the West (1937) - Gold Guard (uncredited)
 The Mysterious Pilot (1937, Serial) - Kilgour - Henchman [Chs.1,3-4,6-9]
 The Lone Ranger (1938, Serial) - Felton - Henchman
 The Painted Trail (1938) - Towers (uncredited)
 Outlaws of Sonora (1938) - Sheriff Trask
 Flight Into Nowhere (1938) - Mechanic (uncredited)
 Six Shootin' Sheriff (1938) - Bar X Foreman
 Phantom Ranger (1938) - Reynolds
 The Fighting Devil Dogs (1938, Serial) - Henchman Wilson [Chs. 2–5, 9]
 Riders of the Black Hills (1938) - Henchman Red Stevens
 Stagecoach Days (1938) - Sheriff (uncredited)
 Squadron of Honor (1938) - Legionnaire (uncredited)
 The Great Adventures of Wild Bill Hickok (1938, Serial) - Henchman Kilgore (Ch.2) (uncredited)
 Pioneer Trail (1938) - Sam Harden
 Little Tough Guy (1938) - Detective Driving Car (uncredited)
 Smashing the Rackets (1938) - Dixon - Detective (uncredited)
 Sunset Trail (1938) - Jake, Trail Patrol Captain (uncredited)
 The Colorado Trail (1938) - Townsman (uncredited)
 Juvenile Court (1938) - Policeman at Accident (uncredited)
 The Renegade Ranger (1938) - Red
 Black Bandit (1938) - Tom - Cowhand (uncredited)
 Prairie Moon (1938) - Henchman Steve
 The Spider's Web (1938, Serial) - Cop in Bank (uncredited)
 Guilty Trails (1938) - Greasy - Rustler (uncredited)
 In Early Arizona (1938) - Fred - Town Councilman (uncredited)
 Rhythm of the Saddle (1938) - Red Malone (uncredited)
 Santa Fe Stampede (1938) - Marshal Jim Wood
 Song of the Buckaroo (1938) - Sheriff Wade
 California Frontier (1938) - Sheriff Tom Watkins (uncredited)
 Jesse James (1939) - Soldier (uncredited)
 Made for Each Other (1939) - Ranger (uncredited)
 Rollin' Westward (1939) - Sheriff
 Lure of the Wasteland (1939) - Carlton Foreman
 Southward Ho (1939) - Union Sergeant
 Trouble in Sundown (1939) - Doctor (uncredited)
 Mexicali Rose (1939) - Alcade's Aide (uncredited)
 Let Us Live (1939) - Police Sergeant (uncredited)
 North of the Yukon (1939) - Carter
 The Night Riders (1939) - Rancher Wilson
 Man from Texas (1939) - Henchman Slim
 The Rookie Cop (1939) - Detective Ryan (uncredited)
 Mandrake the Magician (1939, Serial) - Mill River Inn Henchman (uncredited)
 Mountain Rhythm (1939) - Deputy Tom
 Timber Stampede (1939) - Cattle Thief (uncredited)
 The Oregon Trail (1939, Serial) - Pete Cave Henchman [Ch. 12] (uncredited)
 Frontier Marshal (1939) - (scenes deleted)
 Fangs of the Wild (1939) - Larry Dean
 Konga, the Wild Stallion (1939) - Cowhand (uncredited)
 Full Confession (1939) - Prison Guard (uncredited)
 Flaming Lead (1939) - Bart Daggett
 Allegheny Uprising (1939) - Settler at McDowell's Mill (uncredited)
 Westbound Stage (1939) - Parker - Henchman

1940s

 The Shadow (1940, Serial) - Hijacked Truck Driver (uncredited)
 Five Little Peppers at Home (1940) - Miner (uncredited)
 Northwest Passage (1940) - Ranger (uncredited)
 Phantom Rancher (1940) - Sheriff Parker
 Viva Cisco Kid (1940) - Town Marshal (uncredited)
 Ghost Valley Raiders (1940) - Sheriff
 Dark Command (1940) - Messenger (uncredited)
 Shooting High (1940) - Eph Carson
 Covered Wagon Days (1940) - Martin
 Gaucho Serenade (1940) - Sheriff Tom Olson (uncredited)
 Lillian Russell (1940) - Frank (uncredited)
 The Kid from Santa Fe (1940) - Bill Stewart
 Prairie Law (1940) - Nester (uncredited)
 Wild Horse Range (1940) - Arnold
 Winners of the West (1940, Serial) - Henchman Webb [Ch. 13] (uncredited)
 Deadwood Dick (1940, Serial) - Jake (uncredited)
 When the Daltons Rode (1940) - Lyncher (uncredited)
 Stage to Chino (1940) - Dolan - Henchman
 The Ranger and the Lady (1940) - Independent Freight Wagon Driver (uncredited)
 Roll Wagons Roll (1940) - Henchman Matt Grimes
 Brigham Young (1940) - Raider (uncredited)
 Boom Town (1940)  - Sheriff Harris (uncredited)
 Junior G-Men (1940, Serial) - Kearney - Riot Squad Cop [Ch. 1] (uncredited)
 Wagon Train (1940) - Charlie (uncredited)
 The Gay Caballero (1940) - Man at Fiesta (uncredited)
 Trailing Double Trouble (1940) - Henchman Kirk
 Youth Will Be Served (1940) - Engineer (uncredited)
 Melody Ranch (1940) - Joe #2 - Henchman (uncredited)
 Lone Star Raiders (1940) - Ranch Hand
 Romance of the Rio Grande (1940) - U. S. Marshal
 The Green Hornet Strikes Again! (1940, Serial) - Thug with Explosives (uncredited)
 San Francisco Docks (1940) - Longshoreman (uncredited)
 Riders from Nowhere (1940) - Mason
 Ridin' on a Rainbow (1941) - Rancher Harris (uncredited)
 Western Union (1941) - Slade Henchman #3 (uncredited)
 Across the Sierras (1941) - Man on Wagon (uncredited)
 The Lone Wolf Takes a Chance (1941) - Cop Getting Crane (uncredited)
 Pals of the Pecos (1941) - Sheriff Jeff
 Robbers of the Range (1941) - Henchman Monk Saunders
 The Spider Returns (1941, Serial) - Detective [Ch. 13] (uncredited)
 The Cowboy and the Blonde (1941) - Horse Stable Groom (uncredited)
 Adventure in Washington (1941) - Guard (uncredited)
 Billy the Kid (1941) - Leader (uncredited)
 Men of the Timberland (1941) - Lumberjack (uncredited)
 Broadway Limited (1941) - Engineer (uncredited)
 Two in a Taxi (1941) - Police Officer (uncredited)
 The Son of Davy Crockett (1941) - Logan - Ranger (uncredited)
 Wanderers of the West (1941) - Montana Sheriff
 The Parson of Panamint (1941) - Mining Forman (uncredited)
 Fugitive Valley (1941) - Marshal Warren
 The Lone Rider in Frontier Fury (1941) - Curley
 Dynamite Canyon (1941) - Captain Gray
 Wild Geese Calling (1941) - Minor Role (uncredited)
 Bad Man of Deadwood (1941) - Townsman (uncredited)
 Stick to Your Guns (1941) - Waffles - Bar 20 Cowhand
 Last of the Duanes (1941) - Bland Henchman (uncredited)
 Twilight on the Trail (1941) - Henchman Gregg
 Riding the Sunset Trail (1941) - Sheriff Hays
 Underground Rustlers (1941) - Henchman Tom Harris
 Dude Cowboy (1941) - Silver City Sheriff
 Forbidden Trails (1941) - Marshal Tom (uncredited)
 Arizona Terrors (1942) - Rancher Wade
 West of Tombstone (1942) - Morris
 Cowboy Serenade (1942) - Checker (uncredited)
 Valley of the Sun (1942) - Trooper Parker (uncredited)
 Riding the Wind (1942) - Silent Townsman (uncredited)
 Lone Star Ranger (1942) - Henchman (uncredited)
 Ghost Town Law (1942) - Ace
 Spy Smasher (1942, Serial) - Crane
 Land of the Open Range (1942) - Henchman Tracy Briggs
 Down Texas Way (1942) - Pete
 Stardust on the Sage (1942) - MacGowan
 Perils of the Royal Mounted (1942) - Gaynor - Trapper / Townsman
 Tombstone, the Town Too Tough to Die (1942) - Jailer (uncredited)
 Sons of the Pioneers (1942) - Joe #1 - Henchman (uncredited)
 Riders of the West (1942) - Slim - Lanky Henchman (uncredited)
 Shadows on the Sage (1942) - Franklin
 The Secret Code (1942, Serial) - Weather Bureau Guard (uncredited)
 Bandit Ranger (1942) - Cattle Rustler (uncredited)
 The Omaha Trail (1942) - Oxen Train Bullwhacker (uncredited)
 West of the Law (1942) - Charlie the Bartender (uncredited)
 War Dogs (1942) - Hinkel - Fifth columnist (uncredited)
 Junior Army (1942) - State Trooper (uncredited)
 Red River Robin Hood (1942) - Sheriff Del Auston
 The Ox-Bow Incident (1942) - Deputy (uncredited)
 American Empire (1942) - Rider with Crowder's Posse (uncredited)
 The Valley of Vanishing Men (1942, Serial) - Slater - Henchman
 Ridin' Down the Canyon (1942) - Henchman (uncredited)
 Fighting Frontier (1943) - Henchman Snap
 Tenting Tonight on the Old Camp Ground (1943) - Henchman Pete
 No Place for a Lady (1943) - Air Raid Warden (uncredited)
 Carson City Cyclone (1943) - 1st Sheriff (uncredited)
 Bad Men of Thunder Gap (1943) - Hank Turner
 Idaho (1943) - Henchman (uncredited)
 Santa Fe Scouts (1943) - Billy Dawson
 Wild Horse Stampede (1943) - Henchman Westy
 Daredevils of the West (1943, Serial) - Miller - Henchman (Ch. 1) (uncredited)
 West of Texas (1943) - Steve Conlon
 Song of Texas (1943) - Race Official (uncredited)
 The Stranger from Pecos (1943) - Deputy Steve (uncredited)
 Batman (1943, Serial) - Andrews - Henchman (uncredited)
 The Masked Marvel (1943, Serial) - Marine Café Patron #2 (uncredited)
 Six Gun Gospel (1943) - Murdered Gambler
 Silver Spurs (1943) - Henchman (uncredited)
 The Black Hills Express (1943) - Quitting Driver (uncredited)
 Wagon Tracks West (1943) - Lem Martin
 The Renegade (1943) - Henchman Pete
 Hail to the Rangers (1943) - Jessup
 The Man from the Rio Grande (1943) - King City Marshal (uncredited)
 False Colors (1943) - Poncho Townsman (uncredited)
 Overland Mail Robbery (1943) - Sheriff
 Canyon City (1943) - Sheriff Slocum (uncredited)
 In Old Oklahoma (1943) - Tom - Farmer on Train (uncredited)
 California Joe (1943) - Whitey (uncredited)
 The Woman of the Town (1943) - Crockett Henchman (uncredited)
 The Fighting Seabees (1944) - Johnson (uncredited)
 Captain America (1944, Serial) - Mack - Garage Thug [Ch. 7] (uncredited)
 Beneath Western Skies (1944) - Earl Phillips
 Mojave Firebrand (1944) - Miner (uncredited)
 Hidden Valley Outlaws (1944) - Sheriff McBride
 Rosie the Riveter (1944) - 1st Policeman Arresting Rosie (uncredited)
 The Lady and the Monster (1944) - Man Who Tails Cory (uncredited)
 Tucson Raiders (1944) - Matthews (voice, uncredited)
 Riding West (1944) - Gubbins (uncredited)
 The Tiger Woman (1944, Serial) - Capt. Dumont [Chs. 1, 9-10] (uncredited)
 Silent Partner (1944) - Cop (uncredited)
 Man from Frisco (1944) - Old Salt (uncredited)
 The Yellow Rose of Texas (1944) - Sheriff Allen
 Marshal of Reno (1944) - Sheriff
 Call of the Rockies (1944) - Henchman Hansen
 Silver City Kid (1944) - Sheriff Gibson
 Three Little Sisters (1944) - Twitchell
 The Girl Who Dared (1944) - Neilson - Gas Station Owner (uncredited)
 The San Antonio Kid (1944) - Henchman Long
 Stagecoach to Monterey (1944) - Chester Wade
 Cheyenne Wildcat (1944) - Harrison Colby
 Code of the Prairie (1944) - Henchman Loomis
 My Buddy (1944) - Guard (uncredited)
 Sheriff of Sundown (1944) - Sheriff Tom Carpenter
 Vigilantes of Dodge City (1944) - Denver
 Zorro's Black Whip (1944, Serial) - Commissioner James Bradley
 Faces in the Fog (1944) - Auto Court Manager
 Firebrands of Arizona (1944) - Wagon Driver
 Thoroughbreds (1944) - Pop
 Grissly's Millions (1945) - Policeman Ralph
 The Topeka Terror (1945) - William Hardy
 Great Stagecoach Robbery (1945) - Townsman (uncredited)
 Sheriff of Cimarron (1945) - Frank Holden
 Earl Carroll Vanities (1945) - Tom - Doorman
 Corpus Christi Bandits (1945) - Rocky
 Three's a Crowd (1945) - Grayson
 Flame of Barbary Coast (1945) - Thompson - Townsman in Mob (uncredited)
 Bells of Rosarita (1945) - Studio Gate Guard (uncredited)
 Federal Operator 99 (1945, Serial) - Prof. Crawford [Chs. 5-6]
 Road to Alcatraz (1945) - Guard (uncredited)
 Trail of Kit Carson (1945) - John Benton
 Oregon Trail (1945) - Sheriff Plenner
 Phantom of the Plains (1945) - Duchess Suitor (uncredited)
 Behind City Lights (1945) - Andrew Coleman
 Sunset in El Dorado (1945) - Sheriff Gridley
 Marshal of Laredo (1945) - Barton
 Sunset in El Dorado (1945) - Ben Duncan - Sheriff of Twin Wells
 Rough Riders of Cheyenne (1945) - Sheriff Edwards
 Dakota (1945) - Old-timer (uncredited)
 Girls of the Big House (1945) - Sheriff at Alma's Cell (uncredited)
 Colorado Pioneers (1945) - Sand Snipe
 The Cherokee Flash (1945) - Utah
 Wagon Wheels Westward (1945) - Fake Judge James E. Worth
 The Phantom Rider (1946, Serial) - Ceta - Medicine Man
 Days of Buffalo Bill (1946) - Banty McCabe
 California Gold Rush (1946) - Sheriff Peabody
 Crime of the Century (1946) - Dr. Jackson
 Sheriff of Redwood Valley (1946) - Sheriff
 Murder in the Music Hall (1946) - Ryan - Police Officer
 The Undercover Woman (1946) - Lem Stone
 Alias Billy the Kid (1946) - Dakota
 King of the Forest Rangers (1946, Serial) - Tom Judson [Ch. 1]
 Sun Valley Cyclone (1946) - Sheriff
 Passkey to Danger (1946) - Gerald Bates
 In Old Sacramento (1946) - Bartender (uncredited)
 Man from Rainbow Valley (1946) - Healey
 My Pal Trigger (1946) - Hotel Clerk (uncredited)
 Night Train to Memphis (1946) - Train Conductor (uncredited)
 Red River Renegades (1946) - Pop Underwood
 Conquest of Cheyenne (1946) - Sheriff Dan Perkins
 G.I. War Brides (1946) - (uncredited)
 The Invisible Informer (1946) - Eph Shroud
 Rio Grande Raiders (1946) - Sheriff Tom Hammon
 Roll on Texas Moon (1946) - Sheriff Bert Morris
 Santa Fe Uprising (1946) - Lafe Dibble
 Affairs of Geraldine (1946) - Studio Actor (uncredited)
 Out California Way (1946) - Johnny
 Son of Zorro (1947, Serial) - Mark Daniels (uncredited)
 Last Frontier Uprising (1947) - Skillet - Ranch Cook
 Homesteaders of Paradise Valley (1947) - Rancher
 Twilight on the Rio Grande (1947) - Tom - U.S. Customs Agent (uncredited)
 Dick Tracy's Dilemma (1947) - Cop in Squad Car (uncredited)
 That's My Man (1947) - Racetrack Man (uncredited)
 Saddle Pals (1947) - Dad Gardner
 Rustlers of Devil's Canyon (1947) - The Sheriff
 Blackmail (1947) - Tom - Cashier (uncredited)
 Wyoming (1947) - Will Jennings
 Jesse James Rides Again (1947, Serial) - Sam Bolton
 Marshal of Cripple Creek (1947) - Baker
 Along the Oregon Trail (1947) - Wagon Boss
 Heaven Only Knows (1947) - Townsman (uncredited)
 Driftwood (1947) - Townsman (uncredited)
 The Wild Frontier (1947) - Patrick MacSween
 Under Colorado Skies (1947) - Sheriff Blanchard
 Superman (1948, Serial) - Old-Timer at Mine (uncredited)
 Marshal of Amarillo (1948) - Mr. Snodgrass
 Mark of the Lash (1948) - Lem Kimmerly
 The Far Frontier (1948) - Anderson (uncredited)
 Frontier Investigator (1949) - Jed
 Brand of Fear (1949) - Marshal Blackjack Flint
 South of Rio (1949) - Jim Weston
 Sand (1949) - Clem (uncredited)
 San Antone Ambush (1949) - Tim - Bartender
 Riders in the Sky (1949) - Old Man Roberts
 Texas Manhunt (1949) - Colonel

1950s

 Cody of the Pony Express (1950, Serial) - Doc Laramie
 The Old Frontier (1950) - Banker
 Gunfire (1950) - Barfly (uncredited)
 The Blazing Sun (1950) - Tom Ellis
 Rough Riders of Durango (1951) - Evans - Rancher
 The Secret of Convict Lake (1951) - Jerry - Posse Member (uncredited)
 The Hills of Utah (1951) - Mayor Donovan (uncredited)
 The Old West (1952) - Chadwick (uncredited)
 Trail Guide (1952) - Old Timer
 Rancho Notorious (1952) - Deputy in Gunsight (uncredited)
 High Noon (1952) - Sam (uncredited)
 Apache Country (1952) - Patches - Stage Driver (uncredited)
 Blue Canadian Rockies (1952) - Pop Phillips
 The Marshal's Daughter (1953) - Sheriff Bill (uncredited)
 Pack Train (1953) - Dan Coleman
 Calamity Jane (1953) - Prospector (uncredited)
 Tarantula (1955) - Jeb - First Tramp (uncredited)
 Top Gun (1955) - Casey (uncredited)
 Tribute to a Bad Man (1956) - Cowboy (uncredited)
 Quincannon, Frontier Scout (1956) - Livery Stableman (uncredited)
 The Young Guns (1956) - Lookout (uncredited)
 Friendly Persuasion (1956) - Farmer on Front Line with Gard (uncredited)
 The Storm Rider (1957) - Todd (uncredited)
 Outlaw's Son (1957) - Ore Wagon Driver (uncredited)
 Domino Kid (1957) - Davis - Rancher (uncredited)
 The Tall Stranger (1957) - Ranch Hand (uncredited)
 Day of the Badman (1958) - Roy (uncredited)
 The Sheepman (1958) - Townsman (uncredited)
 Once Upon a Horse... (1958) - Old-Timer (uncredited)
 Man of the West (1958) - Tom (uncredited)
 The Saga of Hemp Brown (1958) - Floyd Leacock (uncredited)
 Good Day for a Hanging (1959) - Farmer Driving Wagon (uncredited)
 Lone Texan (1959) - Old Dan (uncredited)
 Bat Masterson (1959) - Once as the Town sheriff and another as drunken prisoner (uncredited) 

1960s
 Let No Man Write My Epitaph (1960) - Minor Role (uncredited)
 Underworld U.S.A. (1961) - Drunk (uncredited)
 Bat Masterson (1961, TV Series) - Eddie
 13 West Street'' (1962) - Prisoner (uncredited)

References

External links

1889 births
1963 deaths
American male film actors
American male silent film actors
Male actors from Louisville, Kentucky
20th-century American male actors
Male Western (genre) film actors
Burials at Forest Lawn Memorial Park (Glendale)